"I Know" is a 1998 song by American recording R&B/soul artist Luther Vandross. The single was released in support of the album I Know. The single reached its lowest peak at number sixty-one on the Billboard's Hot R&B Singles. The song also features singer Stevie Wonder on harmonica.

Critical reception
Larry Flick of Billboard wrote, "Unfortunately, the previous "Nights In Harlem" didn't go as far as it should have, but the future is bright for the title cut from Vandross' first Virgin Records release. R&B radio programmers should find comfort in the warm familiarity of this sweet ballad, which allows the beloved singer to flex his distinctive voice to maximum effect. Vandross sounds downright blissful moving through an arrangement that sews delicate acoustic guitar riffs and an instantly recognizable harmonica solo by Stevie Wonder into a languid rhythm track. Those good vibes should prove quite contagious as this lovely single begins to circulate."

Track listing
US CD Single (Remixes)
"I Know" feat. Precise - (LP Single Edit)
"I Know" feat. Guru - (A Darkchild Remix Edit)
"I Know" - (LP Edit W/O Rap)

Charts

References

External links
 www.luthervandross.com

1998 songs
Luther Vandross songs
1998 singles
Songs written by Luther Vandross
Virgin Records singles
Songs written by Reed Vertelney